Ceará Sporting Club, or Ceará, as they are usually called, is a Brazilian football team from the city of Fortaleza, capital city of the Brazilian state of Ceará, founded on June 2, 1914, by Luís Esteves and Pedro Freire. Ceará is one of the most traditionally successful clubs in the Northeast region of Brazil alongside Bahia, Santa Cruz, Sport, Náutico, Vitória and their city rivals Fortaleza.

History
On June 2, 1914, the club was founded as Rio Branco Football Club by Luiz Esteves Junior and Pedro Freire. Later, some of their friends also joined: Gilberto Gurgel, Walter Barroso, Raimundo Justa, Newton Rôla, Bolívar Purcell, Aluísio Mamede, Orlando Olsen, José Elias Romcy, Isaías Façanha de Andrade, Raimundo Padilha, Rolando Emílio, Meton Alencar Pinto, Gotardo Morais, Artur de Albuquerque, Cincinato Costa, Carlos Calmon and Eurico Medeiros. As Rio Branco Football Club, the team colors were white and lilac. In 1915, on their first birthday, the club changed its name to Ceará Sporting Club.

In 1941, Ceará won the Campeonato Cearense, the same year of the inauguration of Presidente Vargas stadium. From 1961 to 1963, the club was three times consecutive state champion. In 1969, Ceará won the Northeast Cup.

In 1970, ended the seven-year titleless state championship period. In 1971, Ceará was the last placed team in Campeonato Brasileiro Série A first edition. From 1975 to 1978, the club was four times in a row state champion.

In 1985, Ceará finished 7th in the Brazilian League. This is the best league position of a team from Ceará State in the Brazilian Championships. In 1994, the club finished Brazilian Cup runners-up, beaten by Grêmio in the final. In 1995, Ceará participated in the Copa CONMEBOL, the club's first international championship, becoming the only club of Ceará State to play an international tournament. In 1996, the team administrator was Forró bands businessman Emanuel Gurgel. The team changed its home shirt color to all black. Because of this, the team was nicknamed "Urubu do Nordeste" (Northeast Vulture). From 1996 to 1999, the club was state champion four times in a row .

In 2002, Ceará won the state championship, for the first time in three years. In 2005, Ceará reached the Copa do Brasil semifinals. The club was defeated by Fluminense. In 2006, the club won the state championship after 4 years without winning the competit

In 2010, after a 17-year absence, Ceará was promoted back to the Brazilian League, after finishing third in the 2009 Campeonato Brasileiro Série B. They finished in 12th position, achieving a place in the 2011 Copa Sudamericana.

In 2011, Ceará reached the 2011 Copa do Brasil semi-finals. Ceará ended Ronaldinho's Flamengo's unbeaten streak in the previous round winning the away game, and drew the home game, eliminating the Rio de Janeiro team in a notorious upset. Ceará, however, was defeated by Coritiba in the semi-finals.

Honours
 Copa do Nordeste
 Winners (2): 2015, 2020

 Torneio Norte-Nordeste
 Winners (1): 1969

 Campeonato Cearense
 Winners (45): 1922, 1925, 1931, 1932, 1939, 1941, 1942, 1948, 1951, 1957, 1958, 1961, 1962, 1963, 1971, 1972, 1975, 1976, 1977, 1978, 1980, 1981, 1984, 1986, 1989, 1990, 1992, 1993, 1996, 1997, 1998, 1999, 2002, 2006, 2011, 2012, 2013, 2014, 2017, 2018

Stadium

Ceará's home venue is Estádio Carlos de Alencar Pinto, capacity 3,000, but the team also plays at Castelão Stadium which has a capacity of 60,326, and at Presidente Vargas Stadium, which has a 22,228 capacity.

Rivals
Ceará's greatest rival is Fortaleza. It is the biggest derby in Fortaleza city. It has been played 574 times, with Ceará winning 193 times, Fortaleza winning 176 times and 205 draws.

Ceará's second biggest rival is Ferroviário, the third biggest club of Fortaleza city. This derby has been played 297 times, with 138 wins for Ceará, 69 wins for Ferroviário and 90 draws.

Mascot
The team mascot, an old man known as "Vovô" ("Grandpa") dressing Ceará uniform was designed by Cearense cartoonist Mino for the "Ceará: Paixão Total" Project ("Ceará: Full Passion" Project).

The team mascot appeared in late 1919, when Meton de Alencar Pinto, former president of Ceará SC, coached young players of America Football Club, a small club from the city, in the Porangabussu training center. Meton, who used to call the kids as "my grandsons", asked them to "go easy on grandpa". Afterwards, the nickname started to apply to the team of Ceará as well, helped by the seniority of the club; Ceará Sporting Club was the first football team founded in the state.

Logo evolution

The first logo was the club's first as Ceará Sporting Club, and was used from 1915 to 1954.

The second logo was used from 1955 to 1969 and was inspired by the Santos logo.

The third logo was used from 1970 to 2003.

The fourth logo is the current team logo, and was adopted in 2003. The logo is a restylized version of the previous logo created by Adman Orlando Mota. This logo introduced the white stars and the foundation date.

Players

First-team squad

Academy

Out on loan

Staff

Current staff

Managers

 Jair Pereira (2005)
 Valdir Espinosa (2005)
 Zé Teodoro (2006), (2009)
 Paulo César Gusmão (2009–10)
 René Simões (2010)
 Estevam Soares (2010)
 Mário Sérgio (2010)
 Vágner Mancini (2011)
 Estevam Soares (2011)
 Paulo César Gusmão (2012)
 Ricardinho (2013)
 Sérgio Guedes (2013)
 Sérgio Soares (2013–14)
 Paulo César Gusmão (2014)
 Dado Cavalcanti (2015)
 Silas Pereira (2015)
 Geninho (2015)
 Marcelo Cabo (2015)
 Lisca (2015–16)
 Sérgio Soares (2016)
 Gilmar Dal Pozzo (2017)
 Givanildo Oliveira (2017)
 Marcelo Chamusca (2017–18)
 Jorginho (2018)
 Lisca (2018–19)
 Enderson Moreira (2019)
 Adílson Batista (2019)
 Argel Fucks (2019–20)
 Enderson Moreira (2020)
 Guto Ferreira (2020–21)
 Tiago Nunes (2021–22)
 Dorival Júnior (2022)
 Lucho González (2022)
 Gustavo Morínigo (2023–)

Ultras groups
Cearamor
Movimento Organizado Força Independente (Mofi)

References

External links

Official website

Ceará Sporting Club
Association football clubs established in 1914
1914 establishments in Brazil
Torneio Norte-Nordeste winners